Susan Elizabeth Digby, Baroness Eatwell OBE (née Watts; born 1 July 1958), known as Suzi Digby, is a British choral conductor and music educator.

She is an internationally renowned choral conductor and music educator. Digby founded the influential national arts/education organisation The Voices Foundation (UK primary music education charity). She  founded and runs the following organisations: Voce Chamber Choir; Vocal Futures (nurturing young [ages 16–22] audiences for classical music); Singing4Success (leadership and 'Accelerated Learning' for corporates); and The London Youth Choir (a pyramid of five choirs, ages 8–22, serving all ethnic communities in London's thirty-three boroughs). February 2016 saw the public launch of her professional vocal consort, ORA (commissioning new choral works as 'reflections' of old masterworks). ORA is London-based with residencies planned in the Far East and South America.

Digby is also a Visiting Professor at the University of Southern California (Choral Studies). 

In 2014, she launched her Californian professional vocal consort, The Golden Bridge.

Early life

Born in Japan as Susan Elizabeth Watts, she attended Francis Holland School, Baker Street, before reading music at King's College London where she studied piano and singing.  She lived in Mexico and the Philippines, and then spent 12 years in Hong Kong where she had a television series as well as radio broadcasting, teaching and performing.

Career

In 1990 she was awarded a Winston Churchill Fellowship, which she used to travel and study in Finland, Hungary, Canada and the USA, focusing on methods of choral training and music education. She also trained with Péter Erdei, Head of Choral Studies at the Franz Liszt Academy of Music in Budapest.

In 1993 she founded a national music education charity The Voices Foundation whose methodology is based on that of Hungarian music educator Zoltán Kodály. The same year, Yehudi Menuhin appointed her to spearhead the UK branch of his MUS-E project.  The Voices Foundation Children's Choir, a multi-ethnic choir comprising children from throughout the UK, has performed at State occasions including the VE Day Head of State ceremony and the first National Holocaust Memorial Day and has toured in Europe.

Digby currently serves as one of the Foundation's 20 advisory teachers and is in charge of its education project in primary schools.

From 1996 to 1998, Digby was musical director of Rosslyn Hill Chapel Choir, and from 1998 to 2000 director of the Middlesex Bach Choir.  In 1998 she launched 'Singing Schools', a 5-year programme in South Africa involving 70 schools in Soweto and Johannesburg. More than two hundred African children's songs have been collected and integrated into the UK programme.

In 2000, Digby was invited to become a council member of the Winston Churchill Memorial Trust where she serves as Chairman of the Arts category. That same year she was shortlisted for a Creative Britain Award.  She also founded and directed the award-winning London-based adult chamber choir, Coro.

In 2003, she founded Voce. She was founding musical director of the infant programme of the Finchley Children's Music Group and co-founded Music Box, the Bristol-based children's opera group.

She is also a conductor and has performed in the Royal Albert Hall, St John's, Smith Square, St James's Church, Piccadilly and the Royal College of Music. Abroad, she is guest conductor of St. Stephen's Oratorio Choir, Budapest. She has been a judge for the Coleraine Music Festival in Northern Ireland and Sainsbury's Choir of the Year. Digby has also worked regularly with radio and television in the UK and has presented for BBC Wales TV including BBC Cardiff Singer of the World competition.

In 2008, she acted as a judge on the BBC show Last Choir Standing. In 2010, she founded Vocal Futures, a foundation with the mission to identify, involve and inspire young people to engage with classical music and in particular large scale choral music, performed in unusual spaces. In November 2011, Vocal Futures staged a performance of the St Matthew Passion at Ambika P3, conducted by Digby.

Vocal Futures' second concert, Haydn's The Creation, was conducted by Digby in 2013, followed in 2015 with the multi-media musical event, The Choice. The latter was conducted by Digby and Ben Glassberg and consisted of a performance of Handel's The Choice of Hercules, with selections from Handel's Solomon, plus a newly commissioned work by Toby Young.

Affiliations

Digby is a Trustee of Music in Country Churches, among other music and education charities. 

She is Past President of the Incorporated Society of Musicians and was Acting Music Director of Queens' College, Cambridge (where she founded and runs the Queens' Choral Conducting Programme). Amongst many TV appearances, she has served as a judge on BBC1's hit show, Last Choir Standing, with over seven million viewers. 

She has also worked regularly with radio and television in the UK and has presented for BBC Wales TV, including BBC Cardiff Singer of the World competition. She regularly adjudicates choral competitions and gives workshops and lectures.

Personal life
Susan Watts married in 1980 The Hon. Henry Noel Kenelm Digby, eldest son of Edward Digby, 12th Baron Digby.  She has two children from her first marriage: Edward and Alexandra.  They divorced in 2001.

In July 2006 she married John Eatwell, Baron Eatwell, President of Queens' College, Cambridge.

In 2007, Digby was appointed OBE for services to music education.

References

External links

Voce Chamber Choir
BBC Radio 3 Choir of the Year
Last Choir Standing
Vocal Futures
ORA

Living people
People educated at St Paul's Girls' School
Alumni of King's College London
Women conductors (music)
Officers of the Order of the British Empire
Eatwell
Spouses of life peers
1958 births
21st-century British conductors (music)
Presidents of the Independent Society of Musicians